Josy Dubié is a Belgian reporter, politician and a member of Ecolo. He was a member of the Belgian Senate from 1999 to 2003, and from 2005 to 2009.

Notes

Living people
Ecolo politicians
Members of the Senate (Belgium)
Members of the Parliament of the Brussels-Capital Region
21st-century Belgian politicians
Year of birth missing (living people)